In Greek mythology, Hector is a character in Homer's Iliad. He was a Trojan prince and the greatest warrior for Troy during the Trojan War. Hector led the Trojans and their allies in the defense of Troy, killing countless Greek warriors. He was ultimately killed in single combat by Achilles, who later dragged his dead body around the city of Troy behind his chariot.

Etymology
In Greek,  is a derivative of the verb ἔχειν ékhein, archaic form * ('to have' or 'to hold'), from Proto-Indo-European *seɡ́ʰ- ('to hold'). Hector's name could thus be taken to mean 'holding fast'.

Description 
Hector was described by the chronicler Malalas in his account of the Chronography as "dark-skinned, tall, very stoutly built, strong, good nose, wooly-haired, good beard, squinting, speech defect, noble, fearsome warrior, deep-voiced". Meanwhile, in the account of Dares the Phrygian and also that of the Trojan Priest and author, Dares Phrygius, he was illustrated as ". . spoke with a slight lisp. His complexion was fair, his hair curly. His eyes would blink attractively. His movements were swift. His face, with its beard, was noble. He was handsome, fierce, and high-spirited, merciful to the citizens, and deserving of love.". Greek author and poet, Homer, described Hector as “peace-loving, thoughtful, as well as bold, a good son, husband and father, and without darker motives.”

Biography 
Hector of Troy was a Trojan Prince and warrior of Troy. He was the first-born son of King Priam and Queen Hecuba, making him a prince of the royal house and heir to his father’s throne. Hector wed with Andromache, who was his wife, and the mother of his first and only infant son, Scamandrius, who the people of Troy knew as Astyanax. 

Hector throughout the Trojan War brought glory to the Trojans as he was their best fighter and heir. He was loved by all his people and known for never turning down a fight. He was gracious to all and thus thought of favorably by all, except by the Achaeans. As he was the Trojan's best warrior he was both hated and feared by the Achaeans. He turned the tide of battle, breaking down their barriers and slaughtering their troops. Although when he killed Patroclus, Achilles reentered the war and the Trojans were beaten back again.  

Hector died at the hand of the Achaean warrior named Achilles. According to Homer’s book, “The Iliad”, Hector was killed in single combat by Achilles. Hector’s parents sat on Troy’s wall, pleading for him to take shelter within the safe walls. Hector refused, wanting to talk with Achilles, in an attempt to resolve the altercation without bloodshed, though Achilles was not one to be reasoned with due to Hector slaying his close wartime companion, Patroclus. Achilles chased Hector around the gates of Troy three times. Apollo gave Hector strength so he could always stay in the lead. But whenever he neared the entrance of the walls to the city, Achilles cut him off. Finally Athena took the guise of his favorite brother, Deiphobus telling him that they could face Achilles together. Tricked into thinking he might have a chance at winning, Hector waited for Achilles. He then proposes that whoever wins, be it him or Achilles, will be respectful to the other's body and give it back to the other's friend so they can have a proper burial. Achilles refuses saying that there was "...no love between us. No truce till the other falls and gluts with blood" (Book 22, 313-314). After a short fight, Achilles stabbed Hector in his throat, which resulted in his untimely but fated death. Hector then foretold Achilles' own death, saying that he would be killed by Paris and Apollo.

After slaying him, Achilles stripped him of his armor. The other Achaeans then gathered to look upon and stab Hector's body. Achilles gave a few words in victory and tied Hector’s dead body, by the heels, to his chariot. He dragged him around the city of Troy, as the Trojans in the safety of their walls watched and lamented, especially Andromache Hector's wife. 

What Achilles did was an act of utter disrespect and would later bring the wrath of the gods upon him.

During and after Patroclus' funeral Achilles dragged Hector's body around his pyre. The gods Aphrodite and Apollo protected his body from the dogs, disfigurement, and decomposition. It would be another 12 days until Priam would go to Achilles with a ransom for Hector's body.

Mythology

Greatest warrior of Troy

According to the Iliad, Hector did not approve of war between the Greeks and the Trojans.

For ten years, the Achaeans besieged Troy and their allies in the east. Hector commanded the Trojan army, with a number of subordinates including Polydamas, and his brothers Deiphobus, Helenus and Paris. By all accounts, Hector was the best warrior the Trojans and their allies could field, and his fighting prowess was admired by Greeks and his own people alike.

Duel with Protesilaus
In the Iliad, Hector's exploits in the war prior to the events of the book are recapitulated. He had fought the Greek champion Protesilaus in single combat at the start of the war and killed him. A prophecy had stated that the first Greek to land on Trojan soil would die. Thus, Protesilaus, Ajax, and Odysseus would not land. Finally, Odysseus threw his shield out and landed on that, and Protesilaus jumped next from his own ship. In the ensuing fight, Hector killed him, fulfilling the prophecy.

Duel with Ajax
As described by Homer in the Iliad at the advice of Hector’s brother Helenus (who also was divinely inspired) and being told by him that he was not destined to die yet, Hector managed to get both armies seated and challenged any one of the Greek warriors to single combat. The Argives were initially reluctant to accept the challenge. However, after Nestor's chiding, nine Greek heroes stepped up to the challenge and drew by lot to see who was to face Hector. Ajax won and fought Hector. Hector was unable to pierce Ajax's famous shield, but Ajax crushed Hector's shield with a rock and stabbed through his armor with a spear, drawing blood, upon which the god Apollo intervened and the duel was ended as the sun was setting. Hector gave Ajax his sword, which Ajax later used to kill himself. Ajax gave Hector his girdle that Achilles later attached to his chariot to drag Hector's corpse around the walls of Troy.

The Greeks and the Trojans made a truce to bury the dead. In the early dawn the next day, the Greeks took advantage of the truce to build a wall and ditch around the ships while Zeus watched in the distance.

Duel with Achilles
Another mention of Hector's exploits in the early years of war was given in the Iliad in book IX. During the embassy to Achilles, Odysseus, Phoenix and Ajax all try to persuade Achilles to rejoin the fight. In his response, Achilles points out that while Hector was terrorizing the Greek forces now, and that while he himself had fought in their front lines, Hector had 'no wish' to take his force far beyond the walls and out from the Skaian Gate and nearby oak tree. He then claims, 'There he stood up to me alone one day, and he barely escaped my onslaught.'
Another duel that took place, although Hector received help from Aeneas (his cousin) and Deiphobus, was when Hector rushed to try to save his brother Troilus from Achilles' hands. But he came too late and Troilus had already perished. All Hector could do was to take the lifeless body of Troilus while Achilles escaped after he fought his way through from the Trojan reinforcements.

In the tenth year of the war, observing Paris avoiding combat with Menelaus, Hector scolds him with having brought trouble on his whole country and now refusing to fight. Paris therefore proposes single combat between himself and Menelaus, with Helen to go to the victor, ending the war. The duel, however, leads to inconclusive results due to intervention by Aphrodite who leads Paris off the field. After Pandarus  wounds Menelaus with an arrow, the fight begins again.

The Greeks attack and drive the Trojans back. Hector must now go out to lead a counter-attack. According to Homer his wife Andromache, carrying in her arms her son Astyanax, intercepts Hector at the gate, pleading with him not to go out for her sake as well as his son's. Hector knows that Troy and the house of Priam are doomed to fall and that the gloomy fate of his wife and infant son will be to die or go into slavery in a foreign land. With understanding, compassion, and tenderness he explains that he cannot personally refuse to fight, and comforts her with the idea that no one can take him until it is his time to go. The gleaming bronze helmet frightens Astyanax and makes him cry. Hector takes it off, embraces his wife and son, and for his sake prays aloud to Zeus that his son might be chief after him, become more glorious in battle than he, to bring home the blood of his enemies, and make his mother proud. Once he left for battle, those in the house began to mourn as they knew he would not return. Hector and Paris pass through the gate and rally the Trojans, raising havoc among the Greeks.

Trojan counter-attack
Zeus weighs the fates of the two armies in the balance, and that of the Greeks sinks down. The Trojans press the Greeks into their camp over the ditch and wall and would have laid hands on the ships, but Agamemnon rallies the Greeks in person. The Trojans are driven off, night falls, and Hector resolves to take the camp and burn the ships the next day. The Trojans bivouac in the field.

The next day Agamemnon rallies the Greeks and drives the Trojans

Hector refrains from battle until Agamemnon leaves the field, wounded in the arm by a spear. Then Hector rallies the Trojans:

Diomedes and Odysseus hinder Hector and win the Greeks some time to retreat, but the Trojans sweep down upon the wall and rain blows upon it. The Greeks in the camp contest the gates to secure entrance for their fleeing warriors. The Trojans try to pull down the ramparts while the Greeks rain arrows upon them. Hector smashes open a gate with a large stone, clears the gate and calls on the Trojans to scale the wall, which they do, and

The battle rages inside the camp. Hector goes down, hit by a stone thrown by Ajax, but Apollo arrives from Olympus and infuses strength into "the shepherd of the people", who orders a chariot attack, with Apollo clearing the way. Many combats, deaths, boasts, threats, epithets, figures of speech, stories, lines of poetry and books of the Iliad later, Hector lays hold of Protesilaus' ship and calls for fire. The Trojans cannot bring it to him, as Ajax kills everyone who tries. Eventually, Hector breaks Ajax' spear with his sword, forcing him to give ground, and he sets the ship afire.

These events are all according to the will of the gods, who have decreed the fall of Troy, and therefore intend to tempt Achilles back into the war. Patroclus, Achilles' closest companion, disguised in the armor of Achilles, enters the combat leading the Myrmidons and the rest of the Achaeans to force a Trojan withdrawal. After Patroclus has routed the Trojan army, Hector, with the aid of Apollo and Euphorbus, kills Patroclus, vaunting over him:

The dying Patroclus foretells Hector's death:

Hector's last fight

Hector strips the armor of Achilles off the fallen Patroclus and gives it to his men to take back to the city. Glaucus accuses Hector of cowardice for not challenging Ajax. Stung, Hector calls for the armor, puts it on, and uses it to rally the Trojans.  Zeus regards the donning of a hero's armor as an act of insolence by a fool about to die, but it makes Hector strong for now.

The next day, the enraged Achilles renounces the wrath that kept him out of action and routs the Trojans, forcing them back to the city. Hector chooses to remain outside the gates of Troy to face Achilles, partly because had he listened to Polydamas and retreated with his troops the previous night, Achilles would not have killed so many Trojans. When he sees Achilles, however, Hector is seized by fear and turns to flee. Achilles chases him around the city three times before Hector masters his fear and turns to face Achilles. But Athena, in the disguise of Hector's brother Deiphobus, has deluded Hector. He requests from Achilles that the victor should return the other's body after the duel, (though Hector himself made it clear he planned to throw the body of Patroclus to the dogs) but Achilles refuses. Achilles hurls his spear at Hector, who dodges it, but Athena brings it back to Achilles' hands without Hector noticing. Hector then throws his own spear at Achilles; it hits his shield and does no injury. When Hector turns to face his supposed brother to retrieve another spear, he sees no one there. At that moment he realizes that he is doomed. Hector decides that he will go down fighting and that men will talk about his bravery in years to come. 

Hector pulls out his sword, now his only weapon, and charges. But Achilles grabbed his thrown spears that were delivered to him by the unseen Athena who wore the Hades helmet. Achilles then aimed his spear and pierced the collar bone section of Hector, the only part of the stolen Armor of Achilles that did not protect Hector. The wound was fatal yet allowed Hector to speak to Achilles. In his final moments, Hector begs Achilles for an honorable funeral, but Achilles replies that he will let the dogs and vultures devour Hector's flesh. (Throughout the Homeric poems, several references are made to dogs, vultures, and other creatures that devour the dead. It can be seen as another way of saying one will die.) Hector dies, prophesying that Achilles' death will follow soon:

Be careful now; for I might be made into the gods' curse ... upon you, on that day when Paris and Phoibos Apollo...destroy you in the Skainan gates, for all your valor.

After his death, Achilles slits Hector's heels and passes the girdle that Ajax had given Hector through the slits. He then fastens the girdle to his chariot and drives his fallen enemy through the dust to the Danaan camp. For the next twelve days, Achilles mistreats the body, but it remains preserved from all injury by Apollo and Aphrodite. After these twelve days, the gods can no longer stand watching it and send down two messengers: Iris, another messenger god, and Thetis, the mother of Achilles. Thetis has told Achilles to allow King Priam to come and take the body for ransom. Once King Priam has been notified that Achilles will allow him to claim the body, he goes to his strongroom to withdraw the ransom. The ransom King Priam offers includes twelve fine robes, twelve white mantles, several richly embroidered tunics, ten bars of yellow gold, a special gold cup, and several cauldrons. Priam himself goes to claim his son's body, and Hermes grants him safe passage by casting a charm that will make anyone who looks at him fall asleep.

Achilles, moved by Priam's actions and following his mother's orders sent by Zeus, returns Hector's body to Priam and promises him a truce of twelve days to allow the Trojans to perform funeral rites for Hector. Priam returns to Troy with the body of his son, and it is given full funeral honors. Even Helen mourns Hector, for he had always been kind to her and protected her from spite. The last lines of the Iliad are dedicated to Hector's funeral. Homer concludes by referring to the Trojan prince as the "Breaker of Horses."

In Virgil's Aeneid, the dead Hector appears to Aeneas in a dream urging him to flee Troy.

Historical references

The most valuable historical evidence for the Battle of Troy are treaties and letters mentioned in Hittite cuneiform texts of the same approximate era, which mention an unruly Western Anatolian warlord named Piyama-Radu (possibly Priam) and his successor Alaksandu (possibly Alexander, the nickname of Paris) both based in Wilusa (possibly Ilion/Ilios), as well as the god Apaliunas (possibly Apollo).

Other such pieces of evidence are names of Trojan heroes in Linear B tablets. Twenty out of fifty-eight men's names also known from Homer, including , E-ko-to (Hector), are Trojan warriors and some, including Hector, are in a servile capacity. No such conclusion that they are the offspring of Trojan captive women is warranted. Generally the public has to be content with the knowledge that these names existed in Greek in Mycenaean times, although Page hypothesizes that Hector "may very well be ... a familiar Greek form impressed on a similar-sounding foreign name."

When Pausanias visited Thebes in Boeotia, in the second century AD, he was shown Hector's tomb and was told that the bones had been transported to Thebes according to a Delphic oracle. Moses I. Finley observes "this typical bit of fiction must mean that there was an old Theban hero Hector, a Greek, whose myths antedated the Homeric poems. Even after Homer had located Hector in Troy for all time, the Thebans held on to their hero, and the Delphic oracle provided the necessary sanction."

The pseudepigraphical writer Dares Phrygius states that Hector "spoke with a slight lisp. His complexion was fair, his hair curly. His eyes would blink attractively. His movements were swift. His face, with its beard, was noble. He was handsome, fierce, and high-spirited, merciful to the citizens, and deserving of love."

In literature
 In Dante Alighieri's Inferno (part of the Divine Comedy series), Hector and his family are placed in Limbo, the outer circle wherein the virtuous non-Christians dwell.
 In Chang-rae Lee's The Surrendered, Hector is the name of one of the major characters and is originally from Ilion, New York.
 Roland's sword in the early 12th-century French poem Song of Roland was named Durendal. According to Ludovico Ariosto's Orlando Furioso, it once belonged to Hector of Troy, and was given to Roland by Malagigi (Maugris).
 In William Shakespeare's Troilus and Cressida, Hector's death is used to mark the conclusion of the play. His nobility is shown in stark contrast to the deceit and pridefulness of the Greeks, especially Achilles.

See also
 List of children of Priam
 Nine Worthies

Notes

References 

 Dares Phrygius, from The Trojan War. The Chronicles of Dictys of Crete and Dares the Phrygian translated by Richard McIlwaine Frazer, Jr.. Indiana University Press. 1966. Online version at theio.com
 Gaius Julius Hyginus, Fabulae from The Myths of Hyginus translated and edited by Mary Grant. University of Kansas Publications in Humanistic Studies. Online version at the Topos Text Project.
 Homer, The Iliad with an English Translation by A.T. Murray, Ph.D. in two volumes. Cambridge, MA: Harvard University Press; London: William Heinemann, Ltd. 1924. Online version at the Perseus Digital xLibrary.
 Homer, Homeri Opera in five volumes. Oxford, Oxford University Press. 1920. Greek text available at the Perseus Digital Library.
 Pseudo-Apollodorus, The Library with an English Translation by Sir James George Frazer, F.B.A., F.R.S. in 2 Volumes, Cambridge, MA: Harvard University Press; London: William Heinemann Ltd. 1921. Online version at the Perseus Digital Library. Greek text available from the same website.

External links

 

Trojan Leaders
Characters in the Aeneid
Children of Priam
Princes in Greek mythology